The book writer is the member of a musical's team who creates the book—the musical's plot, character development, and dramatic structure.  Essentially, the book writer is the playwright of the musical, working very closely in collaboration with the lyricist and composer to create an integrated piece of drama.

There is a common misconception that the book writer merely 
The book writer is often also the musical's lyricist, composer, or director.

Occupations in music